

NVC community CG4 (Brachypodium pinnatum grassland) is one of the calcicolous grassland communities in the British National Vegetation Classification system. It is one of four communities of rank, tussocky grassland associated with low levels of grazing, within the lowland calcicolous grassland group.

It is a comparatively widely distributed community. There are three subcommunities.

Community composition

The following constant species are found in this community:
 Tor-grass (Brachypodium pinnatum)
 Glaucous Sedge (Carex flacca)
 Sheep's Fescue (Festuca ovina)

The following rare species are also associated with the community:

 Purple Milk-vetch (Astragalus danicus)
 Musk Orchid (Herminium monorchis)

Distribution

This community is found in lowland limestone grassland throughout England.

Subcommunities

There are three subcommunities:
 the so-called typical subcommunity:
 the Avenula pratensis - Thymus praecox subcommunity
 the Centaurea nigra - Leontodon hispidus subcommunity
 the Holcus lanatus subcommunity

References

 Rodwell, J. S. (1992) British Plant Communities Volume 3 - Grasslands and montane communities  (hardback),  (paperback)

CG04